The chestnut forest rail (Rallicula rubra), also known as the chestnut forest crake, is a species of bird in the family Sarothruridae.  It is found in the Arfak Mountains and western-central New Guinea Highlands.  Its natural habitat is subtropical or tropical moist montane forests.

References

chestnut forest rail
Birds of Western New Guinea
chestnut forest rail
Taxonomy articles created by Polbot